Strephonema is a genus of flowering plants belonging to the family Combretaceae.

Its native range is Western and Western Central Tropical Africa.

Species:

Strephonema mannii 
Strephonema polybotryum 
Strephonema pseudocola 
Strephonema sericeum

References

Combretaceae
Myrtales genera